Spermine synthase (spermidine aminopropyltransferase, spermine synthetase) is an enzyme that converts spermidine into spermine. This enzyme catalyses the following chemical reaction

 S-adenosylmethioninamine + spermidine  S-methyl-5'-thioadenosine + spermine
Spermine synthase is an enzyme involved in polyamine biosynthesis. It is present in all eukaryotes and plays a role in a variety of biological functions in plants Its structure consists of two identical monomers of 41 kDa with three domains each, creating a homodimer formed via dimerization. The interactions between one of the three domains, the N-terminals of the monomers, is responsible for dimerization as that is where the active site is located; the central terminal consisting of four β- strands structurally forming a lid for the third domain, the C-terminal domain.

References

External links

EC 2.5.1